Moskovske is an urban-type settlement in Shakhtarsk Municipality (district) in Donetsk Oblast of eastern Ukraine. Population:

Demographics
Native language as of the Ukrainian Census of 2001:
 Ukrainian 19.71%
 Russian 78.54%
 Belarusian 0.68%

References

Urban-type settlements in Donetsk Raion